Bocage's mole-rat (Fukomys bocagei) is a species of rodent in the family Bathyergidae. It is found in Angola, Namibia, possibly Democratic Republic of the Congo, and possibly Zambia. Its natural habitats are subtropical or tropical dry forests, dry savanna, subtropical or tropical dry lowland grassland, and caves.

References

Woods, C. A. and C. W. Kilpatrick. 2005.  pp 1538–1600 in Mammal Species of the World a Taxonomic and Geographic Reference 3rd ed. D. E. Wilson and D. M. Reeder eds. Smithsonian Institution Press, Washington D.C.

Fukomys
Mammals described in 1897
Taxa named by William Edward de Winton
Taxonomy articles created by Polbot